Two destroyers of the Imperial Japanese Navy were named Fumizuki:

 , previously the Russian Silny she was scuttled in 1905 but was raised by Japan and renamed in 1906. She was stricken in 1913.
 , a  launched in 1926 and sunk in 1944

Imperial Japanese Navy ship names
Japanese Navy ship names